Royal Orchid Hotels a hotel chain operating hotels in India and Kenya.

History 

The flagship hotel was established in Bangalore in 1973 by Chender K. Baljee.

In 2008, Royal Orchid Hotels operated 15 hotels. By May 2015, the count of hotels rose to 28, including 10 owned by the company, and 18 managed through joint ventures or contracts. In 2015, the Royal Orchid Hotels opened its first hotel outside of India, the Hotel Royal Orchid Azure in Nairobi. As of 26 October 2019, Royal Orchid Hotels has 58 hotels under its fold with 3948 keys – just short of 4000 – out of which 47 are under management contract.

In January 2017, Royal Orchid Hotels became the full owner of Amartara Hospitality. In September 2017, the Royal Bank of Scotland Group bought 9.28 lakh shares of Royal Orchid Hotels.

Properties 

As of July 17, 2021, there are 70+ hotels and resorts with 3920 rooms open and operating, in addition to 9 hotels & Resort with 1000+ rooms in the pipeline, under the brand

 
 Regenta Spa & Resort Pushkar - A 5 Star Luxurious Resort Property On Tropical Maldives Theme With 132 Keys, Including 50 Deluxe Rooms 80 Suites Rooms & 2 Presidential Suites Villa, Situated In Aravali Mountains Near Pushkar, Spread In 56 Bigha Land

See also
Hotel
List of hotels

References

Hotel chains in India
Companies based in Bangalore
1973 establishments in Karnataka
Indian companies established in 1973
Companies listed on the National Stock Exchange of India
Companies listed on the Bombay Stock Exchange